William Morton (20 June 1880 – 21 March 1952) was a British-born Canadian cyclist. He competed in five events at the 1908 Summer Olympics. He won a bronze medal in the men's team pursuit.

References

External links
 

1880 births
1952 deaths
Canadian male cyclists
Olympic cyclists of Canada
Cyclists at the 1908 Summer Olympics
Olympic bronze medalists for Canada
Olympic medalists in cycling
People from Hunslet
Medalists at the 1908 Summer Olympics
British emigrants to Canada